Maununneva (Finnish), Magnuskärr (Swedish) is a neighborhood of Helsinki, Finland. It is a subdivision of the Kaarela district in Helsinki.

Neighbourhoods of Helsinki